Indian pink refers to several different wildflowers in the United States:

Lobelia, a genus in the family Campanulaceae
Silene, a genus in the family Caryophyllaceae
Spigelia marilandica, a perennial ornamental plant in the family Loganiaceae